Nadia Graham (born September 3, 1974), also known as Nadia Graham-Hutchinson and Nadia Graham-Hutchins, was a professional sprinter from Jamaica. She won a bronze medal in the 4x400m relay at the 1997 World Championships in Athletics by virtue of running for her team in the preliminary rounds.

In 1996, Graham was honored as female athlete of the year at Middle Tennessee State University. In 1997, her time of 51.45 seconds in the 400 m representing the University of Florida at the Southeastern Conference was at the time a collegiate NCAA Division I leader.

References 

Living people
1974 births
Jamaican female sprinters
World Athletics Championships athletes for Jamaica
20th-century Jamaican women
21st-century Jamaican women